Rai Italia is the international English language television service of Rai Internazionale, a subsidiary of RAI, Italy's public national broadcaster. Rai Italia operates a television network that broadcasts around the world via 3 localized feeds. Programming features a mix of news, discussion-based programs, drama and documentaries as well as sports coverage including 4 live games per week from Italy's top football league, Serie A. From 1996 to 2013, Glauco Benigni is Head of the Press International Office and Head of Promotion and Development of RAI International worldwide.

Audience
Rai Italia is targeted at Italian expatriates, foreign citizens of Italian descent, and non-Italians interested in Italian language and culture; as such the network features a mix of the best programming from Rai as well as original programming created especially for this channel.

Rai Italia started international television broadcasting on New Year's Day  1992 as Rai International, Rai Italia has worked under an agreement with the Italian government to develop the presence of public service in international radio and television broadcasting. Rai Italia also strives to meet the demands for information and services from Italian communities abroad.

Rai Italia broadcasts three television channels, via satellite, which vary according to the different geographical targets. No service is available for Europe as Rai's domestic channels are widely available free-to-air in this region. Rai Italia has organized the satellite service into 4 zones with each having a different localized schedule:

Rai Italia America – Broadcasts to The Americas
Rai Italia Asia – Broadcasts to Asia
Rai Italia Australia – Broadcasts to Australia
Rai Italia Africa – Broadcasts to Africa

In Europe, Rai Italia has broadcast for a short period of timesharing with Rai Med (Arabic language entertainment, FTA), but this broadcast has ended.

Controversy in Canada

In Canada, Rai Italia's programming was originally seen on Telelatino, a Canadian licensed channel launched in 1984 and currently, majority owned by Corus together with three prominent Italian-Canadians. Telelatino ( or "TLN") was launched over a decade before an RAI international TV channel ever existed. TLN had provided a level of availability and variety of Italian domestic and foreign programming to Canadians that was unsurpassed anywhere outside Italy.
However, in 2003, RAI pulled the Rai International programming from Telelatino and, with the help of Rogers Communications (which itself owns several multicultural stations in Toronto under the Omni Television system), petitioned the Canadian Radio-television and Telecommunications Commission (CRTC) to allow Rai Italia to be broadcast in Canada.  Although the Italian community in Montreal was in favour of admitting Rai International into the Canadian media marketplace, the Italian community in Toronto was divided since some believed that it was a ploy by the then Prime Minister Silvio Berlusconi to gain influence over Canadian Italian-language media. This theory may have been advanced by Telelatino's primary carriage of programming from Berlusconi-controlled Mediaset after RAI's Canadian launch.

Originally, the CRTC denied RAI's application, because RAI had improperly denied supply of programming to TLN's Canadian viewers and that RAI's attempt to enter Canada on an unrestricted basis without any Canadian programming and financial obligations would be unfair competition.  However, some Italian-Canadians could watch Rai Italia through grey-market satellite TV viewing cards that allowed them to watch US satellite television.  Eventually, in 2005, the CRTC allowed Rai Italia to broadcast in Canada after a review of its policy on third-language foreign-language TV services.

Logos

See also
RAI, Italy's publicly funded national broadcaster
Rai Satelradio Italy's former international radio service
Mediaset Italia

Notes and references

External links
 Official Website in Italian, English and Spanish

International broadcasters
Television channels and stations established in 1992
Italian-language television stations
Italia